Marc Digruber (born 29 April 1988) is an Austrian alpine ski racer. Digruber specializes in the technical events of Slalom and Giant slalom. He made his Alpine Skiing World Cup debut in the Levi slalom on 14 November 2010.

He lives in Frankenfels, Lower Austria.

World Cup results

Standings through 28 January 2018

References

External links
 
 FIS-ski.com – Marc Digruber – World Cup season standings

1988 births
Living people
Austrian male alpine skiers
People from Sankt Pölten-Land District
Sportspeople from Lower Austria